A scourge is a whip or lash, especially a multi-thong type, used to inflict severe corporal punishment or self-mortification. It is usually made of leather.

Etymology
The word is most commonly considered to be derived from Old French escorgier - "to whip", going further back to the Vulgar Latin excorrigiare: the Latin prefix ex- "out, off" with its additional English meaning of "thoroughly", plus corrigia - "thong", or in this case "whip".

Description

A scourge consists of a rope with metal balls, bones, and metal spikes. 

The scourge, or flail, and the crook are the two symbols of power and domination depicted in the hands of Osiris in Egyptian monuments. The shape of the flail or scourge is unchanged throughout history. However, when a scourge is described as a 'flail' as depicted in Egyptian mythology, it may be referring to use as an agricultural instrument. A flail's intended use was to thresh wheat, not to implement corporal punishment.

The priests of Cybele scourged themselves and others. Such stripes were considered sacred.

Hard material can be affixed to multiple thongs to give a flesh-tearing "bite". A scourge with these additions is called a scorpion.  is Latin for a Roman  and is referred to in the Bible: 1 Kings 12:11: "...My father scourged you with whips; I will scourge you with scorpions" said Rehoboam, referring to increased conscription and taxation beyond Solomon's. The name testifies to the pain caused by the arachnid. Testifying to its frequent Roman application is the existence of the Latin words  'carrying a whip' and  'often-lashed slave'.  According to the Gospel of John, Pontius Pilate, the Roman governor of Judea, ordered Jesus to be scourged.

Scourging was soon adopted as a sanction in the monastic discipline of the fifth and following centuries. (See the sixth-century rules of St. Cæsarius of Arles for nuns, and of St. Aurelian of Arles.) Thenceforth scourging is frequently mentioned in monastic rules and councils as an enforcer of discipline. Its use as a punishment was general in the seventh century in all monasteries of the severe Columban rule.

Canon law (Decree of Gratian, Decretals of Gregory IX) recognized it as a punishment for ecclesiastics; even as late as the sixteenth and seventeenth centuries, it appears in ecclesiastical legislation as a punishment for blasphemy, concubinage and simony. Though doubtless at an early date a private means of penance and mortification, such use is publicly exemplified in the tenth and eleventh centuries by the lives of St. Dominic Loricatus and St. Peter Damian (died 1072). The latter wrote a special treatise in praise of self-flagellation; though blamed by some contemporaries for excess of zeal, his example and the high esteem in which he was held did much to popularize the voluntary use of a small scourge known as a discipline, as a means of mortification and penance. From then on the practice appeared in most medieval religious orders and associations.

The practice was, of course, capable of abuse, as demonstrated in the thirteenth century by the rise of the fanatical sect of the Flagellants, though in the same period we meet with the private use of the "discipline" by such saintly persons as King Louis IX of France and Elisabeth of Hungary.

Metaphoric use
Semi-literal usages such as "the scourge of God" for Attila the Hun (i.e. "God's whip with which to punish the nations") led to metaphoric uses to mean a severe affliction, e.g. "the scourge of drug abuse".

See also
 Flagellation, includes flogging
 Knout
 Skin
 Whip

Notes

References

Further reading
H. H. Mallinckrodt, Latijn-Nederlands woordenboek (Latin-Dutch dictionary)

Whips
Ritual weapons